Beauty & the Beast is a Canadian-American science fiction police procedural television series filmed in Toronto, Canada, very loosely inspired by the 1987 CBS series of the same name, developed by Sherri Cooper-Landsman and Jennifer Levin that premiered on The CW on October 11, 2012, and ended its run on September 15, 2016. Kristin Kreuk and Jay Ryan star in the title roles alongside Austin Basis, Nina Lisandrello, Nicole Gale Anderson, Sendhil Ramamurthy, Max Brown, Brian J. White, Amber Skye Noyes and Michael Roark.

Plot
Catherine Chandler witnessed her mother's murder and was almost killed herself until someone—or something—saved her. After nine years, now working as a detective for the NYPD, a case leads her to Vincent Keller, an ex-soldier believed to have been killed in action during military service, who is actually alive. As Catherine comes to know him, she finds out more about her mother's murder and about who—and what—Vincent really is.

Cast and characters

 Kristin Kreuk as Catherine Chandler 
 Jay Ryan as Vincent Keller
 Austin Basis as J.T. Forbes
 Nina Lisandrello as Tess Vargas
 Brian White as Joe Bishop (season 1)
 Max Brown as Evan Marks (season 1; guest, season 4)
 Sendhil Ramamurthy as Gabriel Lowen (seasons 1–2)
 Amber Skye Noyes as Tori Windsor (season 2)
 Nicole Gale Anderson as Heather Chandler (seasons 3–4; recurring, seasons 1–2)
 Michael Roark as Kyle Johnson (season 4)

Development

Conception
The CW officially began developing the series in September 2011. The project was described as "a modern-day romantic love story with a procedural twist," unlike the original series which was a romantic drama with mystery and suspense elements. The show is the first project that Mark Pedowitz developed when he joined the network.

Production
The network ordered a pilot of the series in January 2012. The pilot of the show was filmed in Toronto, Canada from March 22 to April 2, 2012. It was picked up by The CW on May 11, 2012, and was scheduled to premiere during the 2012–13 television season. Filming of the first season continued in Toronto from July 27 and production on the thirteenth episode was completed on December 21, 2012. On November 9, 2012, a full season was ordered. On April 26, 2013, Beauty & the Beast was renewed for a second season. Filming of Beauty & the Beast was split between New York City, NY and Toronto from the second season. On May 8, 2014, Beauty & the Beast was renewed for a third season.<ref name="season3renewal">{{cite web|url=http://tvbythenumbers.zap2it.com/2014/05/08/beauty-and-the-beast-renewed-by-the-cw/261847/|archive-url=https://web.archive.org/web/20140508223837/http://tvbythenumbers.zap2it.com/2014/05/08/beauty-and-the-beast-renewed-by-the-cw/261847/|url-status=dead|archive-date=May 8, 2014|title=Beauty and the Beast', 'The 100' and 'Hart of Dixie' Renewed by The CW|last=Kondolojy|first=Amanda|work=TV by the Numbers|date=May 8, 2014|access-date=May 8, 2014}}</ref> Filming on season three commenced on August 29, 2014, and ended on February 12, 2015. On February 13, 2015, The CW renewed the series for a fourth season, before the third season began airing. On October 13, 2015, it was announced that the upcoming fourth season would be its last. Filming of the fourth and final season began on May 29, 2015 and ended on November 17, 2015. The final season premiered on June 2, 2016, before concluding on September 15, 2016.

Casting
Casting announcements began in February 2012, when Kristin Kreuk was first cast in the lead role of Catherine Chandler. Austin Basis was then cast in the role of J.T. Forbes, Vincent's best friend. Nina Lisandrello and Nicole Gale Anderson were then added to the cast, with Lisandrello landing the role of Tess Vargas, Catherine's partner and best friend. Anderson signed on to the recurring role of Heather Chandler, Catherine's younger sister. Jay Ryan joined the series in the second lead role, Vincent Keller (the character was originally called Vincent Koslow, though in the original series, Vincent had no last name). Max Brown signed on for the role of Dr. Evan Marks, a medical examiner who has feelings for Catherine. Brian White was the last actor to sign onto the series. White joined in the role of Joe Bishop, Catherine and Tess' commanding officer at the NYPD, who becomes romantically involved with Tess. White's character of Joe Bishop was not included in the second season of the series; the story line was that Bishop lost his job because he focused too much attention on finding the killer of his brother instead of performing his duties.

Episodes

ReceptionBeauty & the Beast has received mixed reviews from critics. The review aggregator website Rotten Tomatoes reported 19% and 83% critics' approval ratings for seasons one and two respectively, and overall series ratings of 51% and 76% from critics and audiences respectively. The website's consensus limited to the first season reads, "A thoroughly middling romantic fantasy series, Beauty and the Beast suffers from a silly premise, mediocre writing, and bland characterization." The series was given a 34 out of 100 score on Metacritic, indicating "generally unfavorable" reviews from 20 critics. Kyle Anderson of Entertainment Weekly gave the pilot of Beauty & the Beast a C− grade, stating that it lacks the same charm that the 1980s drama had, and that 'The Beast' is more of a Hulk rather than an actual beast. David Wiegand of the San Francisco Chronicle called the series an "overheated, badly written, wretchedly acted and unconvincing drama, which makes mincemeat out of the traditional beauty and the beast fairy tale." Mary McNamara of the Los Angeles Times also made similar observations but praised Nina Lisandrello who still remains as the only cast member in the show to ever receive a positive review. About Lisandrello, McNamara wrote "the only point of light is provided by Catherine's partner, Tess, who, as played with great common-sense appeal by Nina Lisandrello, clearly deserves to be on a better show." More mixed but slightly favorable reviews were provided by David Hinckley of the New York Daily News, who said the series was "such a natural it's downright devilish" and Neil Genzlinger of The New York Times'', who stated the "girl-power themes will probably play well to the network's core audience."

Ratings

Awards and nominations
The show has been honored with acknowledgements from the People's Choice Awards, Teen Choice Awards and Saturn Awards as well as the Leo Awards, Canadian Screen Awards, the American Society of Cinematographers, the Canadian Society of Cinematographers and the Directors Guild of Canada.

Broadcast
TVGN aired the first four episodes of the second season of the show back to back from May 11, 2014. This was the first syndication style broadcast of the show in the United States. The first four seasons have also been released to stream on Netflix in some regions and made available to purchase on iTunes. In 2019 Start TV began airing the show in the 5 a.m. ET/PT slot.

Tie-ins

Novels
A series of tie-in novels, written by Nancy Holder, have been published through Titan Books.

DVD releases

References

External links

 
 

 
2012 American television series debuts
2016 American television series endings
2010s American crime drama television series
2010s American police procedural television series
2010s American romance television series
2010s American science fiction television series
American fantasy television series
The CW original programming
English-language television shows
Fictional portrayals of the New York City Police Department
Television series by CBS Studios
Television shows filmed in Toronto
Television series reboots
Television shows set in New York City
Works based on Beauty and the Beast
Serial drama television series